Kurtziella corallina is a species of sea snail, a marine gastropod mollusk in the family Mangeliidae.

This species is considered by Tucker as a synonym of Kurtziella serga (Dall, W.H., 1881)

Description
(Original description) Shell.— High, narrow, with squarish lines. It has a biconical shape. It is ribbed and spiralled. It is of a frosted white colour and coral-like texture. The shell showe a scalar, blunt, but small-pointed spire, a smallish body whorl, a conical base, and a small, undefined snout.

Sculpture : Longitudinals— there are about 13 ribs on each whorl. But they do not all exactly answer from whorl to whorl. They rise feebly just at the suture, but quickly increase in height, more slowly
in breadth. In the sinus-area they are curved. From the shoulder they are straight, with only a slight curve on the base. They die out on the snout. They are narrow and rounded, and are parted by rounded furrows of three times their breadth. The whole surface is also fretted with sharp minute lines of growth. Spirals—there is a straight, slightly drooping shoulder below the suture. This ends above the middle of the whorl in a distinct angulation defined by a fine thread, which rises into small, sharp, rounded tubercles as it crosses the ribs. On the penultimate whorl a finer thread begins to appear in the inferior suture, but gradually rises above it. It is from this lower spiral that the contraction of the base begins: on the base are 3 or 4 finer spirals parted by spaces about four times their width. These are then followed by several weaker crowded spirals, then one stronger and more prominent : all these rise into small tubercles on crossing the ribs: beyond the end of the ribs, on the snout, are some 6 fine distinct threads. The whole surface between these is closely covered with very fine spiral threads, which on all the longitudinal lines of growth are beset with most orderly and regular microscopic blunt prickles, which give the corallike aspect to the surface.

The colour of the shell is white. The tip alone is smooth.

The spire is conical and scalar. The protoconch consists of 4 embryonic whorls, which are bluntly conical, depressed, rounded, ribbed, with a distinct suture, and rise to a minute tip (crushed). The shell contains 8 whorls in all, broad and short, of regular increase, sharply keeled at the shoulder-spiral, and from this very slightly contracted, but altogether angular, not curved. The body whorl is small, but attenuated, not constricted, is scarcely convex on the base, and is produced into a short, vaguely defined, and very obliquely pointed snout. The suture is very slight, but defined by the angulation at which the whorls meet. The aperture is small, narrow, slightly pear-shaped, very little oblique, bluntly triangular above, and prolonged into the short, open, scarcely narrowed siphonal canal below. The outer lip is flat at the shoulder, angulated at the keel, scarcely convex below this. The edge projects as a thin sharp lamina beyond the last longitudinal rib, which serves as a varix from the point of the shell to the keel. The edge is hardly convex, and scarcely forms a shoulder above. The sinus is merely a small rounded hollow. The inner lip shows a glaze that is exceptionally narrow and short. The curve of the lip is a very little concave at the base of the columella, which is rather longer and narrower than one would expect, and which is cut off in front with a long, slightly oblique, bluntly rounded, twisted edge.

It is extremely alike with Kurtziella acanthodes. But one easily notices the relatively shorter and broader form and the squarer outline and ribbing of this.

Distribution
This marine species occurs in the West Indies off St Thomas and the Virgin Islands

References

External links
  Tucker, J.K. 2004 Catalog of recent and fossil turrids (Mollusca: Gastropoda). Zootaxa 682:1–1295.

corallina
Gastropods described in 1881